Heldorado  is a 1946 American Western film starring Roy Rogers set during the annual Helldorado Days celebrations in Las Vegas. It was the last teaming of Roy and comedy relief sidekick Gabby Hayes. Hayes shares a scene with Pat Brady who later became Rogers' comedy relief sidekick.

Plot
Roy Rogers is a Captain in the Nevada Rangers who plans to take some well earned leave to go to Helldorado celebrations. His leave is interrupted when the Sheriff of Clark County, Nevada requests his help to investigate money laundering being done by an organized crime syndicate.  The Syndicate uses impoverished local playboy Alec Baxter to launder thousand dollar bills at the gaming tables of the casinos of the state.

During this time socialite Carol Randall is elected Queen of the Helldorado Rodeo and is also made a deputy sheriff.  When Alec is murdered Carol uses her badge and wiles to investigate Alec's murder that brings her into conflict with Captain Rogers. The Syndicate is awaiting a new shipment of funds to launder and tries to assassinate Roy during the Helldorado treasure hunt.

Cast
 Roy Rogers ...  Nevada Ranger Captain Roy Rogers  
 Trigger  ...  Trigger, Roy's Horse  
 George 'Gabby' Hayes  ...  Gabby  
 Dale Evans  ...  Carol Randall  
 Paul Harvey  ...  C.W. Driscoll  
 Brad Dexter  ...  Alec Baxter (billed as Barry Mitchell)  
 John Bagni  ...  Johnny 
 John Phillips  ...  Sheriff  
 Malcolm 'Bud' McTaggart  ...  Bellboy 
 Rex Lease  ...  Charlie the Bartender 
 Steve Darrell  ...  Mitch 
 LeRoy Mason  ...  State Ranger  
 Charles Williams  ...  Carnival Judge  
 Eddie Acuff  ...  Carnival Shooting-Gallery Attendant  
 Pat Brady  ....  Himself 
 Bob Nolan and the Sons of the Pioneers

Songs
 Heldorado
Written by Jack Elliott
Performed by Roy Rogers and the Sons of the Pioneers
 Good Neighbor
Written by Jack Elliott
Performed by Roy Rogers and Dale Evans
 My Saddle Pals and I
Written by Roy Rogers
Performed by Roy Rogers and the Sons of the Pioneers
 Silver Stars, Purple Sage, Eyes of Blue
Written by Denver Darling
Performed by Roy Rogers
 You Ain't Heard Nothin' Till You Hear Him Roar
Written by Bob Nolan
Performed by Pat Brady and the Sons of the Pioneers

Quotes
Don't put on that badge until Halloween - Roy to Deputy Sheriff Carol 
(after releasing Carol imprisoned inside a refrigerator) Does the light go out inside? - Roy

External links
 

1946 films
1946 Western (genre) films
American Western (genre) films
American black-and-white films
Films directed by William Witney
Films set in the Las Vegas Valley
Films shot in the Las Vegas Valley
Republic Pictures films
1940s English-language films
1940s American films